Nathaniel Peabody Rogers (June 3, 1794 – October 16, 1846) was an American attorney turned abolitionist writer, who served, from June 1838 until June 1846, as editor of the New England anti-slavery newspaper Herald of Freedom. He was also an activist for temperence, women's rights, and animal rights.

Biography
A native of the New Hampshire town of Plymouth, Nathaniel Peabody Rogers was the fifth child of Harvard-educated physician and poet, John Rogers (1755–1814), and his wife, Betsy Mulliken. Young Nathaniel entered Dartmouth College in 1811 but, within a few months, suffered severe internal damage while participating in a game of football, and was forced to withdraw for a year of recuperation, with the injuries continuing as a source of pain for the remainder of his life, ultimately contributing to his death at age 52. Returning to Dartmouth, he graduated in 1816, studied law with Salisbury attorney and future Massachusetts congressman Richard Fletcher until 1819, and was admitted to the New Hampshire Bar that year. In 1822, he married Mary Porter Farrand; they had 8 children.

In 1838, giving up a lucrative 19-year legal practice in his native Plymouth and moving to Concord, he became editor of the abolitionist newspaper Herald of Freedom, to which he had been contributing articles since its 1835 founding by the New Hampshire Anti-Slavery Society. His editorial writings, noted for an impulsive, unaffected and witty, sometimes sarcastic, style as well as for poetic descriptions of nature, were widely reprinted in New York Tribune and other anti-slavery newspapers, under the pen name "The Old Man of the Mountain". In 1840, he represented New Hampshire abolitionists in London at the World Anti-Slavery Convention, but he withdrew in protest when the convention refused to seat American women delegates. He did however appear in the painting that recorded the convention. Returning to America and finding himself widely praised for supporting equality of the sexes, as well as equality of color, he received offers to head major newspapers and became known as a public speaker on issues of temperance, women's rights and the abolition of slavery, in the process becoming the subject of Henry David Thoreau's 1844 Dial essay, "Herald of Freedom", which Thoreau revised for its 1846 republication in memoriam of Rogers.

Four months before his death, sensing failing health, Rogers wrote to his old friend, the poet John Greenleaf Whittier:I am striving to get me an asylum of a farm. I have a wife and seven children, every one of them with a whole spirit. I don't want to be separated from any of them, only with a view to come together again. I have a beautiful little retreat in prospect, forty odd miles north, where I imagine I can get potatoes and repose,—a sort of haven or port. I am among the breakers, and 'mad for land.' If I get this home,—it is a mile or two in among the hills from the pretty domicil once visited by yourself and glorious Thompson,—I am this moment indulging the fancy that I may see you at it before we die.Whittier published a posthumous profile of his anti-slavery compatriot as a chapter in the 1850 literary collection, Old Portraits and Modern Sketches.

Rogers died at his home in Concord in October 1846. He is buried in Concord's Old North Cemetery; his tombstone reads, "Here lies all that could die of Nathaniel Peabody Rogers, patriot, lawyer, journalist, friend of the slave."

Animal rights 
Rogers was an early advocate for animal rights; he wrote favourably of William Hamilton Drummond's The Rights of Animals and argued:What is the foundation of human rights, that is not foundation, for animal rights also? A man has rights—and they are important to him because their observance is necessary to his happiness, and their violation hurts him. He has a right to personal liberty. It is pleasant to him—permanently pleasant and good. It is therefore his right. And every creature—or I will call it, rather, every existence, (for whether created or not, they certainly exist, they are) every existence, that is capable of enjoying or suffering, has its rights, and just mankind will regard them. And regard them as rights.

Notes

References
Bell, Charles H. (1894). The Bench and Bar of New Hampshire
Pillsbury, Parker (1881). "Nathaniel Peabody Rogers", Granite Monthly, vol. 4, no.7 (April).
Rogers, N.P. (1847). A Collection from the Newspaper Writings of Nathaniel Peabody Rogers. Concord, N.H.: John R. French
Sartwell, Crispin (2019), How Thoreau Became a Radical
Stearns, Ezra S. (1906). History of Plymouth, New Hampshire

External links

 Nathaniel Peabody Rogers at Internet Archive
 Nathaniel Peabody Rogers at The Online Books Page
 Nathaniel Peabody Rogers at Digital Commonwealth
 Nathaniel Peabody Rogers collection from the Haverford College Quaker & Special Collections
 

1794 births
1846 deaths
19th-century American essayists
19th-century American lawyers
19th-century American male writers
19th-century pseudonymous writers
Activists from New Hampshire
American abolitionists
American animal rights activists
American editors
American essayists
American public speakers
American temperance activists
American women's rights activists
Dartmouth College alumni
People from Plymouth, New Hampshire
Writers from New Hampshire